Keiferia is a genus of moths in the family Gelechiidae.

Species
 Keiferia altisolani (Kieffer, 1937)
 Keiferia brunnea Povolný, 1973
 Keiferia chloroneura (Meyrick, 1923)
 Keiferia colombiana Povolný, 1975
 Keiferia dalibori King & Montesinos, 2012
 Keiferia educata Povolný, 2004
 Keiferia elmorei (Keifer, 1936)
 Keiferia funebrella Povolný, 1984
 Keiferia georgei (Hodges, 1985)
 Keiferia glochinella (Zeller, 1873)
 Keiferia griseofusca Povolný, 1984
 Keiferia gudmannella (Walsingham, 1897)
 Keiferia inconspicuella (Murtfeldt, 1883)
 Keiferia lobata Povolný, 1990
 Keiferia lycopersicella (Walsingham, 1897)
 Keiferia powelli Povolný, 2004
 Keiferia propria Povolný, 1990
 Keiferia rusposoria Povolný, 1970
 Keiferia subtilis Povolný, 1984
 Keiferia vitalis Povolný, 1990
 Keiferia vorax (Meyrick, 1939)

References

 
Gnorimoschemini